Pakistan Television Corporation (reporting name: PTV) is the Pakistani state-owned broadcaster. Pakistan entered the television broadcasting age in 1964, with a pilot television station established at Lahore.

Background

Historical context
The idea of establishing a media and television industry was conceived in late 1956 and created by the privately set up national education commission, with the support of President Ayub Khan in 1960. In 1961, the private sector media mogul and industrialist Syed Wajid Ali launched a television industrial development project, bringing the role of Ubaidur Rahman, an electrical engineer in the Engineering Division of Radio Pakistan, as the project director of the first television station in Lahore. Ali reached a milestone in 1961 after establishing a private television broadcasting company with the cooperation of Nippon Electric Company (NEC) of Japan and Thomas Television International of the United Kingdom.

In 1963, a public meeting was chaired by President Ayub Khan; in which the government made decisions about the Pakistan Television stations and the media industry in the country. Since 1963, its headquarters are in Islamabad, near the Cabinet Secretariat. From 1961 to 1962, a television headquarters was established in Lahore and several pilot transmission tests were taken by Rahman's team. Subsequently, many television divisions were established throughout Pakistan by this team, including East-Pakistan.

First-ever broadcast and private ownership

On 26 November 1964, after an introduction by Syed Wajid Ali, the first-ever news broadcast was done which was beamed as a black and white transmission by the PTV. The first programme, formatted by Thomas Television International, telecast amateur programmes with foreign films; the television division in the Punjab Province was established with the help of United Nations Educational, Scientific and Cultural Organization (UNESCO), the Colombo Plan, and the Government of Japan. Aslam Azhar (1932–- 29 December 2015) was appointed the first managing director of the Pakistan Television in charge of all the staffing requirements at the first PTV Lahore Center. This first managing director and executive Aslam Azhar is widely considered to be the "father of Pakistan Television". Private industries commercials were permitted with no fee; initially all the commercials of industrial conglomerates were tax-free with no additional charges.

The PTV remained under the private sector management with more than half of the shares were sold to Ministry of Information and Broadcasting in a fear that all shares would fall into the hands of government in the name of greater interest of the country. President Ayub Khan appointed Ubaidur Rahman in the Ministry of Information to continue with the NEC joint venture collaboration in launching the PTV.

The project began with a tent on the back lot of Pakistan Broadcasting Corporation by Ubaidur Rahman where a transmission tower and a studio were constructed by his team. On 26 November 1964, President Ayub Khan inaugurated the first official television station commencing transmission broadcasts from Lahore, followed by Dacca on 25 December 1964 (then the capital of East Pakistan; renamed to Bangladesh Television in 1971), a third centre was established in Rawalpindi and Islamabad in 1965 and the fourth in Karachi in 1966. On 29 May 1967, a private company was established as Pakistan Television Corporation under the Company Act, 1913, whereas the private sector remained charged with broadcasting on the television. At that time, all studio programmes were telecasted live as no VTR recording machines were available, which were made available in 1968.

Nationalization of Pakistan Television

After the Indo-Pakistani war in 1971, the PTV was nationalized and brought in completely under the government-ownership management by then-President Zulfikar Ali Bhutto's government. Communication network expansion was vast by the PTV and government publicly funded its infrastructure expansion all over the country.

Promotion of regional literature, science-fiction miniseries, country music, and romanticizing rural values in drama playwrights were on-aired by the PTV, at the behest of public funding by the Government of Pakistan. The PTV was considered as source of major national integration.

Microwave National Network was established among the centres of PTV in 1973 while Quetta and Peshawer centers were started in 1974.

The PTV transmission switched over from its original black and white to color transmission in 1975. Regional headquarters of PTV and television centers were established in Peshawar and Quetta in 1974. In 1977–78, the PTV broadcast the live Cricket match between England vs. Pakistan. During this time, the PTV's interview programming series brought many scientists, politicians, sportsmen, actors, musicians, and artists to public fame.

Development

By the 1980s, the transmissions of PTV could be reached over 90% area of Pakistan. In 1980s, the PTV was the sole provider of television, and dominated the electronic media industry. During 1980s, the conservative ideas were promoted on the PTV as part of the government policy, and heavy investments were made on the promotion of education programming series.

During the decades of the 1970s, 1980s and 1990s, PTV dramas and teleplays were considered as the best in the Indian subcontinent. These included Khuda Ki Basti (1969–74), Unkahi (1982), Tanhaiyaan (1985), Aangan Terha, Fifty Fifty (1979–84), Studio Dhai (2-1/2), Studio Ponay Teen (2-3/4), Andehra Ujala (1984), Sona Chandi (1983), Uncle Urfi, Taleem-e-Baalighan, Alif Noon (1981–82), Waaris (1979), Dhoop Kinare (1987), Sunehray Din, Guest House Alpha Bravo Charlie, Ana, Akhri Chatan, Zair, Zabar, Pesh (1974–75) and block buster serials like  Dhuwan, Kath Putli, Wafa Ham Nibhaein Gai, Bandhan, Kaghaz Kay Phool, Muqqdas, Bint-e-Adam, Malangi (2006), Sawan, Sheela Bagh, Tinkay, Aisa Bhi Hota Hai, Rasta De Zindagi, Chubhan, Kuch Lamhay, Khuwahesho Kay Sarab, and many others.

In 1990s, the PTV's programming was said initially to have intellectual appeal but succumbed to commercial pressure. In 1992, the composition of PTV's programming was based upon on 56% of entertainment, and only 25% of news and educational programmes. About 54% of national programming was based on Urdu and only 16% accounted for English. In response to challenges by private channels such as STN and NTM as well as Indian channels. PTV started its second TV Channel PTV-2 in 1992, it was the first-ever satellite channel of Pakistan as well. PTV-2 was the first Pakistani channel to appear on airwaves of Asia, Africa and Australia. PTV/PTV-1 joined this very satellite beam in 1993–94. PTV-2 was renamed as PTV World in 1998 and became digital on satellite in 1999. PTV expanded its broadcast area to Europe and later in North America in public-private partnership as PTV-Prime. STN came under PTV in 1999 as Channel-3 and started its regular broadcast with new name in 2000 as an all purpose channel. STN/Channel-3 was also visible on satellite.

State capital revenue
Unlike other state-run corporations, Pakistan Television Corporation was allowed by the Government of Pakistan to raise a sizable amount of private capital to finance the stations. This includes a Rs. 35 per month TV fee charge to all consumers of electricity.

Programming policy
The broader perspective to start electronic media in the country was to inform and educate the people through wholesome entertainment and to inculcate in them a greater awareness of their own history, heritage, current problems and development as well as knowledge of the world at large.

In fulfillment of its broad and main objectives, PTV's broadcast policy concerning matters of national and international interests has always been motivated and guided by the cardinal principles of educating viewers about the values that are vitally important in building a united, integrated and disciplined society. These objectives have successfully been achieved through programmes centered towards Islam, education, entertainment and culture.

The projection of new, emerging social order is highlighted in PTV's general programming, focusing on themes like morality, civic or national responsibilities, drive against narcotics, environmental pollution, agricultural reforms etc. through discussions, shows, and through anchorpersons in its broadcasting schedule.

Channels

PTV had been received via satellite in South Asia, East Asia and the Middle East, Africa, Europe and North America. Selected programming could be seen on a satellite channel named Prime TV (with a partnership with PTV) in the United Kingdom, Europe and North America until 22 April 2006. On 22 April 2006, Pakistan Television Corporation started broadcasting directly to overseas viewers including the US. This remains true as of January 2016.

PTV operates the following channels:
PTV Home – 24-hour entertainment channel (the original PTV also called as PTV ONE), the transmission is broadcast across Pakistan on terrestrial network and worldwide through satellite. The content of the terrestrial and satellite channel is different, for example, terrestrial programming includes live telecast of Pakistan's cricket matches but satellite channel cannot broadcast these matches. 
PTV News – 24-hour Urdu news channel which can be viewed in many parts of the globe. Replaced PTV World in 2007. 
 PTV Sports– 24-hour sports channel that started its regular transmission from January 2012, it was planned in 2003 in Mir Zafarullah Khan Jamali's tenure but not launched due to political reasons. Now it's a cricket channel which is scrambled and not free for viewers on satellite. Another channel for sports is in pipeline since February 2016.
 PTV World – 24-hour English news and current affairs channel. Started as PTV-2 in 1992 as first satellite channel of Pakistan, was given a new name of PTV World in 1998 later and went off air in 2007, it was re-launched in January 2013.
PTV Global – Offered exclusively for the Pakistani diaspora in the United States on Dish Network, and Europe.
 PTV National – An emphasis on broadcasting programmes in different languages to represent the whole of Pakistan.
AJK TV [PTV Azad Jammu & Kashmir] –  For the residents of Azad Jammu and Kashmir. 
PTV Bolan – For speakers of Balochi Pashto and Brahvi.
PTV Parliament – Launched on 30 May 2018, brings live proceedings of Pakistani parliament and its committees.
PTV Teleschool - Launched on 14 April 2020, to compensate for academic loss in light of the COVID-19 pandemic.

In May 2021, PTV News & PTV World started broadcasting on YouTube with high definition transmission to start from June 2021.

Pakistan Television News informs its viewers across the country on the latest newsworthy happenings on the national and international levels. During the past few years, there has been rapid expansion in the area and scope of news coverage.

 Following the Pakistani private news channels, PTV News gives on-camera reporting and special news reports.
 PTV news broadcasts stretch over from early morning till midnight. There are news bulletins in Urdu, English, Arabic and Kashmiri languages. All the news bulletins are being aired on the national network which are beamed through satellite to more than 38 countries.
 Regional language bulletins include Punjabi,  Pothohari and Saraiki from Lahore Centre, Sindhi from Karachi Centre, Pushto and Hindko from Peshawar, and Baluchi, Pushto and Bravi from Quetta Centre are telecast.
 To bring home maximum coverage of international events, PTV news has made arrangements with leading news agencies, to satellite news items to PTV Islamabad round the clock. PTV news covers all visits abroad of VVIPs, international conferences, and important other events through its own camera teams and makes possible to air them live.

Current Affairs Division

Current affairs programmes have been a regular feature of PTV Transmission, ever since its inception. A separate PTV Current Affairs Directorate was established in 1982.

Current affairs programmes, including regional languages, produced by each of the TV Centre are accommodated in regular PTV transmission. The themes of regional language programs mainly revolve around local and provincial matters of current affairs nature. The Current Affairs Division produces programs on special occasions such as live telecast of Armed Forces Parade on Pakistan Day, live telecast of flag hoisting ceremony on Independence Day, Head of State's Address to the Nation, documentaries on important national projects, live telecast of certain sessions of Senate and National Assembly. In the program Open Forum, Federal Ministers/Minister of States are invited to answer the questions through e-mail, on Telephone and by Media/Experts sitting in the various studios of Ptv. This program is live and is very popular amongst viewers.

Sports Division

Division was created in 1983 to provide healthy entertainment to viewers. It has emerged as an extremely productive and earning division for the PTV.
 The chief objectives of this division are to arrange healthy sports entertainment through the coverage of exciting moments and happening in the field of sports and to keep the viewers abreast with the National and International sports event.
 Sports Division is producing 200 minutes regular weekly transmission on PTV apart from occasional international/national sports coverage. PTV televises live national and international sports around the world, keeping in view the interest of Pakistani viewers.

PTV Films Division

On 9 June 2022 Minister of Information and Broadcasting Marriyum Aurangzeb and PTV launches PTV Films Division along with another initiative was being launched by the name of PakFlix which would feature the 75 years of rich content in the form of dramas, films and other genres in the archives of PTV, The purpose of these is to bring films to the PTV screen but also to generate quality content in the country.

International Relations Division

International Relations Division of Pakistan Television Corporation participates in the international television festivals/competitions sending best of its PTV programs to them. PTV has won distinguished prizes and commendations at those events.

A large number of PTV programs have been sold for telecast in other countries which resulted in strengthening of the financial condition of PTV. Such companies as Shalimar Recording and Broadcasting Company and Sports Star International Company are the major distributors of PTV programmes.

A lot of PTV plays and documentaries have been provided to foreign countries through government ministries and missions abroad free of charge for the projection of Pakistan and its people.

Dubbing and editing is carried out by PTV International Relations Division. Some selected programs are subtitled in English and Arabic languages for overseas projection especially for Muslim countries. Documentaries from National Geographic Magazine are being televised with Urdu dubbing. 

PTV has procured foreign canned programs on hire/rental basis. PTV procures foreign programs including feature films, cartoons, science fiction, comedy, adventure, classic drama serials/series and public general-interest programs.

PTV Engineering Division

The Engineering Division takes care of the day-to-day operations and maintenance of PTV centers and Rebroadcast Stations, new projects, Planning & Procurement, as well as Research and Development activities.

It was an engineering feat at the time Pakistan began television transmissions in 1964 at Lahore, long before its neighbors Iran in 1966 and India in 1965. Over the years, the system has grown into a countrywide network offering two programming channels. The engineering feat was a success because NEC (Nippon Electronic Corporation) co-operated with and helped PTV launching. Ptv is also known as Pakistan TeleVision.

Information Technology Division 
The IT Department was established as a Division of PTV in 1988 and as of today has a team of 450 IT professionals with representation in all PTV Centres namely Islamabad, Lahore, Karachi, Peshawar, Multan, Quetta and Muzafarabad, AJK as well as at the PTV Headquarters in Islamabad. The IT Department provides in-house software for the News systems for PTV-News, which includes all electronic news collection, relay and on-screen presentation. In-house software created by the IT Department including mNIMS & NAPeS for PTV-News, MAPS-RT for playback installed at all PTV Centres, software for Accounting and Medical database management as well as numerous others for the automation of processes at PTV.

PTV Censor Board

Shortly after the VTR was brought to PTV in 1967, they needed a way to know if the recorded programs were suitable for TV airing. Therefore, PTV Censor Board was formed in 1968 and is headed by Director Programs Administration. It was separately instituted within PTV on the approval of the Secretary, Ministry of Information and Broadcasting in December 1980 to clear and certify bulk of imported and locally acquired programs with speed and efficiency. PTV Consultant of News/Current Affairs/Presentation presently heads the PTV Censor Board.

Training academy

Established in 1987, Pakistan Television Academy is an apex TV institution in Pakistan, which imparts professional training in disciplines of television broadcast technology. It is headed by a full-time director and assisted by a team of television professionals who are members of the academic faculty.

As of June 1998, over 3100 people had attended training programmes conducted by PTV Academy. They attended training courses in engineering, computers, finance, administration, news, current affairs and programme production. They included visiting participants from other countries including SAARC country members.

Pakistan Television Corporation Network Channels List  

PTV Home HD 
PTV News HD 
PTV Sports HD 
PTV World
PTV Global 
PTV National
PTV Teleschool
PTV Azad Jammu & Kashmir 
PTV Bolan 
PTV Parliament

Upcoming Channels List  

PTV Cricket HD

PTV Kids HD

PTV Classic & Gold

PTV Music & Mosiqi HD

PTV English HD

PTV Movies HD

PTV Wrestling HD

PTV Mazhab

PTV logo
Ubaidur Rahman the first general manager and originator of PTV commissioned Pakistan's supremo artist Abdur Rahman Chughtai to design a conceptual logo for PTV, this logo was later redesigned with minor modifications by another leading artist Shahzad Nawaz Khan for a more up-to-date look. Recently in the year 2016, PTV's channel logos were redesigned by PTV's Creative Manager (Design) Babur Saghir. By redesigning the logos of these ten channels of PTV his design philosophy was as follows: "The harmony in the design of our new logos depicts unity and connectivity. The non-conventional shape represents modernity, innovation and the new age of PTV. PTV engraved on gold symbolizes the last 50 years of our very strong connection with our audience (PTV Golden Anniversary was celebrated in 2014). The diverse colour palette is representative of the diversity of our people. The golden stroke shows dynamism and the transformation of PTV."

Corporate management

The chairman/CEO is appointed by the prime minister and, finally confirmation approved by the president. The chairman heads the board of governors that are appointed by the Government of Pakistan to manage its affairs and reports directly to the Information Secretary of Pakistan.

The managing director (MD) is the administrative head of the PTV with executive responsibilities. The appointment of MD comes from the approval from the Government of Pakistan and approval from the chairman of the PTV.

The early team in 1964 at PTV-Lahore Center
Ubaidur Rahman – founder and chief executive officer of PTV; first general manager, by the appointment of President Ayub Khan in 1964
Aslam Azhar – first managing director of PTV Lahore Television Center (26 November 1964)
 Nisar Hussain – first program producer / director of PTV- Lahore Center)
 Mumtaz Hamid Rao – first news reporter in the field, later news editor and head of news and current affairs
 Zubair Chaudhry
 Fazal Kamal – hired away from old Radio Pakistan, Karachi station by Aslam Azhar to join his PTV Lahore Center team in 1964
 Nisar Mirza – cameraman
 Khurshid Akhtar Naqvi – cameraman
 Mustafa Kamal Mandokhail
 Sharif Khan Poonchwaley – sitar player
 Tufail Niazi – folk singer
 qavi Khan - Actor
 Muslehuddin – first news reporter of PTV Programs at Lahore Television Center
 Zafar Samdani – first news editor at PTV Lahore Center
Tariq Aziz- first on-air news broadcaster PTV Lahore Television Center (26 Nov 1964)
 Kanwal Hameed – first female news broadcaster
 Syed Mohsin Ali was the legendary drama producer of PTV News, who produced popular and award-winning drama serials including Tanhaian, Ankahi, Aathwaan Samandar, and the serial Jinnah say Quaid, about the founder of Pakistan Muhammad Ali Jinnah.  Ali was also awarded a Lifetime Achievement Award and many other PTV Awards. He was also the teacher of famous film and drama producer Shoaib Mansoor. They jointly produced the drama serial Sunehry Din.
 Zia Nisar Ahmad - Managing Director 1977-1985 (served the longest tenure to date)

PTV personalities

See also
List of television stations in Pakistan
List of television programmes broadcast by the PTV

References

External links
 PTV Network

 
Government-owned companies of Pakistan
Television stations in Pakistan
State media
Television channels and stations established in 1964
Publicly funded broadcasters
Multilingual broadcasters
Public broadcasting in Pakistan
Pakistan federal departments and agencies
1964 establishments in Pakistan
Nationalization
Ministry of Information and Broadcasting (Pakistan)